Beltzhoover may refer to:

People 
 Frank Eckels Beltzhoover (1841–1923), American politician
 Jacob Beltzhoover (1770–1835), American pioneer

Places 
 Beltzhoover (Pittsburgh), a neighborhood of Pittsburgh, Pennsylvania, United States